Shekar Natarajan (Chandrashekar Natarajan), was born 23 July 1979 in Secunderabad, India. He is the Executive Vice President, Chief Supply Chain Officer of American Eagle Outfitters and CEO of Quiet Platforms wholly owned Subsidiary of AEO. He also serves as a panelist at international conferences and writes in the field of supply chain management.

Early life
Natarajan was born in Secunderabad, Telangana, India. Natarajan received his bachelor's degree in mechanical engineering from Jawaharlal Nehru Technological University, Hyderabad in India and master's degree in industrial engineering from Georgia Institute of Technology in 2003. He also holds an executive certificate from the Center of Transportation and Logistics at MIT, and an Advanced Management Degree from Harvard Business School. He is an alumnus of Harvard Business School.

Executive career
Natarajan previously worked with Coca-Cola Bottling Co. Consolidated as the Senior Supply Chain Network Manager and as a Corporate Development Specialist for Alliance Rubber Company. He then moved on to PepsiCo in 2006, where he was the Director of Supply Chain Planning. While there, he was in charge of the company's new "direct store delivery" system, a transformation for which he received the Council of Supply Chain Management Professionals 2010 Supply Chain Innovation Award.

He next moved to Anheuser Busch to serve as the North American Senior Director of Supply Chain Planning. In September 2013 Natarajan was named Vice President of Business Process and Technology, Integrated Supply Chain Management at Disney. He later became the Vice President of Last Mile and Emerging Sciences at Walmart, where he worked on projects including the implementation of drone technology into Walmart warehouse infrastructure and delivery systems. Natarajan and his team developed the autonomous drones in collaboration with the Federal Aviation Administration and NASA in an effort to significantly improve the efficiency of inventory checks and improve the safety of Walmart's distribution centers. Natarajan demonstrated the technology at a distribution center in Arkansas in 2016. In November 2016, he then became the Senior Vice President of Network Planning and Operational Design of Target Corporation. Natarajan joined American Eagle Outfitters in December 2018 as Senior Vice President of Global Supply Chain, Logistics and Services before becoming Executive Vice President, Chief Supply Chain Officer for AEO and President of Quiet Platforms.

Industry Contributions 
His approach to supply chain management has been described as, "first ... have in place 'diametrically opposite alternative' plans ... [2nd] constantly evaluate those plans, based on changing conditions and sensitive variables ... [3rd] understand that the planning process is continuous in nature, with no defined end point ... [4th] make sure that the right people are in the right jobs." Supply & Demand Chain Executive also wrote of Natarajan's ideas on supply chain management that, "To bring competitive advantage to their enterprises, supply chain executives must also look to hire, train and retain creative problem-solvers, Natarajan adds. The goal is to drive "productivity of the mind" within the supply chain organization, emphasizing systematic thinking and developing problem-solving skills." Natarajan pointed out in the article that increasing supply chain efficiency is a method of adding coinciding value in other parts of the company as well.

In 2013 Natarajan partnered with Ron Hammond to research a series of best practices in the supply chain management industry. Based on that research they created a "supply chain maturity" model, used to identify a range of corporate behaviors, and places corporations into one of five categories: myopic, sluggish, aware, anticipative, and prescient. He is also a public speaker on the subject of supply chain and executive management. 

Natarajan's delivery systems, typified by the "CoolLift" technology, reduced the workplace injuries of work floors where they were employed by 97%, reduced the carbon footprint of the system by 50%, and reduced delivery costs by 2.5%. He has also been involved with on the ground delivery logistics, creating urban-specific delivery plans in traffic congested cities like São Paulo, Brazil in order to deal with traffic jams. In Tanzania and Zambia, Natarajan also linked his delivery systems to the delivery of children's medication through the Cola Life program, which distributed medications to delivery locations of Coca-Cola for no additional charge.

Board positions
Natarajan is a member of the editorial advisory board for Material Handling & Logistics, an industry member of the board for the College Industry Council of Material Handling equipment, on the board for the Material Handling Institute of America, was the co-chairman of the Institute of High Performance Planners, is on the board of Colalife, and an advisory board member of DC Velocity, a supply chain magazine. He is also a member of the Catastrophic Disaster Recovery Plan program headed by the White House.

Awards and recognition

Natarajan won the Medallion Award from the Institute of Industrial Engineering in 2010.

In 2008 the Brazilian government recognized him for his keynote delivery at Movimat 2008. In 2009 Global Supply Chain Review named Natarajan to its list of "Top 25 Supply Chain Executives". In 2010 he was named one of the top visionaries of the year by Consumer Goods Technology and a 2009 as well as 2010 "Rainmaker" by DC Velocity. In 2010 he also received an Institute of Industrial Engineers Medallion for "outstanding contribution to the field of industrial engineering through leadership and innovation of methodology". In addition, he was "formally recognized him for the content and insights he provided for developing and managing supply chain processes" by the government of Brazil, in response to his keynote address at the 2008 Motimat conference. In 2011 Natarajan was then named a Next-generation Thought-leader by Supply & Demand Chain Executive and again called a thought leader in 2013 by Logistics Insight Asia. In 2013 Natarajan was named one of the "Non-Resident Indians of the Year" in the Professional Category by Times Now television. Supply Chain Quarterly named Natarajan a "Pragmatic Futurist" in 2018. In 2020, he won the Retail Innovator of the year award. In 2021, he won 2021 American Supply Chain Leadership Award and 2021 Visionary Award.

Books
 Planning by Design, co-authored with Richard Muther
 Simplified Systematic Network Planning, co-authored by Lee Hales
 Systematic Logistics Redesign and Optimization
 Art and Science of Planning Anything

Personal life 
Natarajan is married to Hima Venkata. They have been married since 2007.

References

Further reading 
 Global Supply Chain Predictions for 2012
 Developing Supply-Chain Rooted CEOS
 Key In on Supply Chain Resiliency Through SI5ES

External links
 Homepage

1979 births
Living people
Indian mechanical engineers
Georgia Tech alumni
Jawaharlal Nehru University alumni
People from Secunderabad